André Bellessort (19 March 1866 in Laval, Mayenne – 22 January 1942 in Paris) was a French writer.

Biography
Bellessort was a not only a poet and essayist but also a traveller who went to Chile, Bolivia and Japan. He is known for his influence on his pupils as a teacher in hypokhâgne in the Lycée Louis-le-Grand, notably related in Robert Brasillach's memories, Notre avant-guerre.

1866 births
1942 deaths
People from Laval, Mayenne
Lycée Janson-de-Sailly alumni
Members of the Académie Française
20th-century French non-fiction writers
19th-century French poets
French male essayists
French male poets
Members of the Ligue de la patrie française
19th-century French male writers
19th-century French essayists
20th-century French male writers
Lycée Louis-le-Grand teachers